John E. Mathews was an American film director who worked briefly in Australia during the silent period. He also ran an acting school.

Select filmography
The Unknown (1915) – short
The Rebel (1915)
The Heart of a Champion (1915) – documentary about Les Darcy
Murphy of Anzac (1916)
Remorse, a Story of the Red Plague (1917)

References

External links

J. E. Mathews at National Film and Sound Archive

Australian film directors
American film directors
Year of birth missing
Year of death missing
Place of birth missing
American emigrants to Australia